Nancy Green (born May 25, 1952) is an American cellist.

Biography 
Green was born in Boston in 1952 and started playing the cello at age eight. She attended the Juilliard School, studying with Leonard Rose, Lynn Harrell, and Mstislav Rostropovich. Green received a Rockefeller grant to study in London with the cellist Jacqueline Du Pré, and spent time in Dusseldorf under the tutelage of Johannes Goritzki. In 1976 her debut at Carnegie Hall, sponsored by the Concert Artists Guild, was described as one by a "fine young musician" by the New York Times. In 1978 Green performed a cello solo with the Chappaqua Chamber Orchestra.

Green became the first cellist to record the complete Hungarian Dances of Brahms arranged by Piatti, Donald Francis Tovey's sonata for solo cello, the complete works for cello and piano of Robert Fuchs, Mario Castelnuovo-Tedesco and Arensky. Her recordings of cello pieces have been reviewed by the media. In addition to recording, Green has taught at the Guildhall School of Music and the Chethams School of Music. In 1995, she joined the faculty at the University of Arizona, where she was head of cello studies. In 2005 she left academia to focus her time on performing and recording music. Green's collaborative partner, R. Larry Todd, has written publications on their recordings and their CD Felix Mendelssohn - The Complete Works for Cello and Piano was reviewed alongside the liner notes. She also performs with her cousin Frederick Moyer, and recordings of her with Moyer are described as "musically thoughtful".

Nancy Green lived in England, Holland, and Germany from 1978 to 1995.  She taught at the Guildhall School of Music and Drama in London, Chetham's School of Music in Manchester (UK), and upon returning to the U.S. taught at the University of Arizona in Tucson until 2006.  She presently resides in the U.S.

The minor planet 11067, discovered in 1992, is named Greenancy in honor of Green.

Recording career 
Green is known primarily as a recording artist.  Her first commercial CD was an LP for GM Recordings of works by Tchaikovsky and Rachmaninoff.  This was followed by three CDs on the Biddulph Recordings label (London, UK), two of which have been reissued on the American label, JRI Recordings.  She has also recorded two CDs for Cello Classics (UK).  

Her first three CD releases included world premieres of the complete works of Robert Fuchs, 21 Hungarian Dances by Brahms arranged by Alfredo Piatti, and the complete works of Mario Castelnuovo-Tedesco.  Subsequent world premieres include the complete works of Anton Arensky, works by Venezuelan composer Paul Desenne (including multi-tracked works for multiple cellos), complete works of Ferdinand Ries, and Donald Frances Tovey's sonata for solo cello. 

Green partnered with pianist/musicologist R. Larry Todd in a recording of complete works for cello and piano of Felix Mendelssohn and Fanny Mendelssohn-Hensel.  This recording included the world premiere of Mendelssohn-Merk Variations in A Major, a work for which the cello part had been lost and for which Todd wrote a cello part.  This work has been subsequently published by Bårenreiter in their edition of the complete works, with R. Larry Todd as editor.

Selected works

References

External links 
, July 9, 2021

Living people
Cellists
University of Arizona faculty
Juilliard School alumni
1952 births